Manilkara pubicarpa is a species of plant in the family Sapotaceae. It is endemic to Guyana.

References

pubicarpa
Plants described in 1952
Vulnerable plants
Flora of Guyana
Endemic flora of Guyana
Taxonomy articles created by Polbot